Sara Jane Moore (née Kahn; born February 15, 1930) is an American criminal who attempted to assassinate U.S. President Gerald Ford in 1975. She was given a life sentence for the attempted assassination and was released from prison on December 31, 2007, after serving 32 years. Moore and Lynette "Squeaky" Fromme are the only two women to have attempted to assassinate an American president; both of their attempts were on Gerald Ford and both took place in California within three weeks of one another.

Background
Moore was born in Charleston, West Virginia, the daughter of Ruth (née Moore) and Olaf Kahn. Her paternal grandparents were German immigrants. Moore had been a nursing school student, Women's Army Corps recruit, and accountant. Divorced five times, she had four children before she turned to revolutionary politics in 1975. Moore comes from a Christian background. She later began practicing Judaism.

Moore's friends said that she had a fascination and an obsession with Patricia Hearst. After Hearst was kidnapped by the Symbionese Liberation Army (SLA), her father Randolph Hearst created the organization People In Need (PIN) to feed the poor as a response to the SLA's claims that the elder Hearst was "committing 'crimes' against 'the people. Moore, a volunteer bookkeeper for PIN, had been serving as an FBI informant there until the moment she attempted to assassinate Ford.

Attempted assassination of Gerald Ford

Moore had been evaluated by the Secret Service earlier in 1975, but agents decided that she posed no danger to the president. She had been picked up by police on an illegal-handgun charge the day before the Ford incident, but was released. The police confiscated her .44 caliber revolver and 113 rounds of ammunition.

Moore's assassination attempt took place in San Francisco on September 22, 1975, just 17 days after Lynette "Squeaky" Fromme's attempted assassination of Ford. She was using a gun she bought in haste that same morning and did not know the sights were 15 cm (6 inches) off the point-of-impact at that distance, and she narrowly missed.

After realizing she had missed, Moore raised her arm again, and Oliver Sipple, a former Marine, dived toward her and grabbed her arm, possibly saving Ford's life. Sipple said at the time: "I saw [her gun] pointed out there and I grabbed for it. [...] I lunged and grabbed the woman's arm and the gun went off." The bullet from the second shot ricocheted and hit John Ludwig, a 42-year-old taxi driver. Ludwig survived. U.S. District Judge Samuel Conti, who sentenced Moore, voiced his opinion that Moore would have killed Ford had she had her own gun, and it was only "because her gun was faulty" that the president's life was spared.

Trial and imprisonment
Moore pleaded guilty to attempted assassination and was sentenced to life in prison. At her sentencing hearing Moore stated: "Am I sorry I tried? Yes and no. Yes, because it accomplished little except to throw away the rest of my life. And, no, I'm not sorry I tried, because at the time it seemed a correct expression of my anger." She served her term at the federal women's prison in Dublin, California, where she worked in the UNICOR prison labor program for $1.25 per hour as the Lead Inmate Operating Accountant. Moore had the Federal Bureau of Prisons register number 04851-180.

In 1979 she escaped but was captured hours later.

In an interview in 2004, former President Ford described Moore as "off her mind" and said that he continued making public appearances, even after two attempts on his life within such a short time, because "a president has to be aggressive, has to meet the people."

Release
On December 31, 2007, at age 77, Moore was slated to be released from prison on parole after serving 32 years of her life sentence. Ford had died from natural causes on December 26, 2006, one year and five days before her release. Moore had later stated that she regretted the assassination attempt, saying she was "blinded by her radical political views". Moore was released under a federal law that makes parole mandatory for inmates who have served at least 30 years of a life sentence and have maintained a satisfactory disciplinary record. When asked about her crime in an interview, Moore stated, "I am very glad I did not succeed. I know now that I was wrong to try."

In February 2019, Moore was arrested for violating her parole by failing to tell her parole officer of a trip out of the country; she was subsequently released in August 2019.

Media
On May 28, 2009, Moore appeared on NBC's Today program, her first television appearance since leaving prison on parole.

Moore also discussed her 1979 escape from prison. She revealed that an inmate told her, "when jumping the fence just put your hand on the barbed wire, you'll only have a few puncture wounds." She went on to say, "If I knew that I was going to be captured several hours later, I would have stopped at the local bar just to get a drink and a burger."

Excerpts from an interview with Moore by Latif Nasser appear on an episode of the radio program Radiolab titled "Oliver Sipple", which was released on September 22, 2017. In the interview, Moore discusses the scene from the day she attempted to assassinate President Ford and her perspective of being stopped by Oliver Sipple.

In popular culture
Moore's story is one of nine assassins starring in Stephen Sondheim and John Weidman's musical Assassins. Moore, John Wilkes Booth, Charles J. Guiteau and Leon Czolgosz appear in "The Gun Song".

A biography of Moore called Taking Aim at the President was published in 2009 by Geri Spieler, a writer who had a correspondence with Moore for 28 years.

References

External links
Photograph of Ford and his Secret Service agents taken just after Moore fired her shot.
Photographs of both the Fromme and Moore assassination attempts from the Ford Presidential Library.
More photographs of both the Fromme and Moore assassination attempts from the Ford Presidential Library.

1930 births
20th-century criminals
American escapees
American former Christians
20th-century American Jews
American failed assassins
American people convicted of attempted murder
American prisoners sentenced to life imprisonment
Converts to Judaism from Christianity
Escapees from United States federal government detention
Failed assassins of presidents of the United States
Federal Bureau of Investigation informants
Living people
Military personnel from West Virginia
People from Charleston, West Virginia
People paroled from life sentence
Presidency of Gerald Ford
Prisoners sentenced to life imprisonment by the United States federal government
Women's Army Corps soldiers
21st-century American Jews
American people of German descent